Pig is a simple dice game first described in print by John Scarne in 1945. Players take turns to roll a single dice as many times as they wish, adding all roll results to a running total, but losing their gained score for the turn if they roll a 1.

As with many games of folk origin, Pig is played with many rule variations, including the use of two dice instead of one. Commercial variants of two-dice Pig include Pass the Pigs, Pig Dice, and Skunk. Pig is commonly used by mathematics teachers to teach probability concepts.

Pig is one of a family of dice games described by Reiner Knizia as "jeopardy dice games", where the dominant type of decision is whether or not to jeopardize previous gains by rolling for potential greater gains.

Gameplay 
Each turn, a player repeatedly rolls a die until either a 1 is rolled or the player decides to "hold":

 If the player rolls a 1, they score nothing and it becomes the next player's turn.
 If the player rolls any other number, it is added to their turn total and the player's turn continues.
 If a player chooses to "hold", their turn total is added to their score, and it becomes the next player's turn.

The first player to score 100 or more points wins.

For example, the first player, Donald, begins a turn with a roll of 5. Donald could hold and score 5 points, but chooses to roll again. Donald rolls a 2, and could hold with a turn total of 7 points, but chooses to roll again.  Donald  rolls a 1, and must end his turn without scoring.  The next player, Alexis, rolls the sequence 4-5-3-5-6, after which she chooses to hold, and adds her turn total of 23 points to her score.

Optimal play 

Optimal play for 2-player Pig was computed by Todd W. Neller and visualized by Clifton G. M. Presser in 2001.  At any time, the relevant decision information includes the player's score, the opponent's score, and the turn total.  Such information corresponds to a 3D point in the graph's space.  If this point is inside the gray solid, the player should roll.  Otherwise, the player should hold.

Many 2-dice variants have been analysed, and human-playable Pig strategies have been compared to optimal play. For example:

 'Hold at 20' is a popular strategy. Each turn, the player rolls until they score 20 or more, then holds. This strategy has a 8% disadvantage against optimal play. 
 'Hold at 25' was found to be more effective. This has a 4.2% disadvantage against optimal play. 
 '4 scoring turns' holds at 25 on the first turn, then on subsequent turns divides the amount needed to reach 100 by the number of turns remaining. This has a 3.3% disadvantage against optimal play. 
 'End race or keep pace'. If either player has a score of 71 or higher, roll to win. Otherwise, hold on 21 plus the difference between scores divided by 8. This has a 0.9% disadvantage against optimal play.

Variations

Two-Dice Pig 

This variation is the same as Pig, except:
Two standard dice are rolled. If neither shows a 1, their sum is added to the turn total.
If a single 1 is rolled, the player scores nothing and the turn ends.
If two 1s are rolled, the player’s entire score is lost, and the turn ends.
 If a double is rolled, the point total is added to the turn total as with any roll but the player is obligated to roll again (possible sub-variation of the two-dice game)

Some versions of this game instead use 6 as the "bad" die face.

Big Pig 
This variation is the same as Two-Dice Pig, except:
If two 1s are rolled, the player adds 25 to the turn total.
If other doubles are rolled, the player adds twice the value of the dice to the turn total.

Skunk 
Skunk (or Think) is a variation of Two-Dice Pig that is played with large groups.  Rather than rolling in turn, all players begin the round standing. At any point in the round, a player may hold by sitting down.  The round continues until a 1 is rolled, or all players have sat down. Skunk is played in five rounds, and scoring is recorded in a 5-column table with columns labeled with the letters of the word "SKUNK".  The first round score is entered in the "S"-column, the next in the first "K"-column, and so on.  After five rounds, the highest-scoring player is the winner.

Hog 
Hog is played with a larger number of dice. On a player's turn, they choose any amount of dice to roll, and throw those dice. If they roll any 1s, they score zero for their turn; otherwise they score the sum of the dice. Play then passes to the next player. The game continues to a target score.

Pass the Pigs 

The commercial game Pass the Pigs is similar to two-dice Pig, and is played with two small model pigs being thrown, similar to shagai bones.

In this game, a roll of left side and right side has the same consequences as rolling a 1 (i.e., the turn ends with the loss of the turn total), and a roll with pigs touching has the same consequences as rolling two 1's (i.e., the turn ends with the loss of the turn total and score). Pass the Pigs is similar to Frey's variant in that two pigs in the same non-side configuration score double what they would individually.

Teaching 
Pig often serves as a simple example for teaching probability concepts from the middle school level upwards. The game also provides exercises for teaching computer science in areas ranging from introductory courses to advanced machine learning material.

References

External links 
 The Game of Pig website
 Online Two-Dice Pig applet

Dice games